Landford Heath is an 11.75 hectare biological Site of Special Scientific Interest near Landford in southeast Wiltshire, England. It was notified in 1994.

Sources
 Natural England citation sheet for the site (accessed 7 April 2022)

External links
 Natural England website (SSSI information)

Sites of Special Scientific Interest in Wiltshire
Sites of Special Scientific Interest notified in 1994